Parkbus is a Canadian not-for-profit organization that provides bus transportation from major cities to nearby parks and conservation areas. Its purpose is to enable citizens to access nature and the outdoors without owning a car.

Parkbus started in 2010 as a private initiative developed by a group of outdoor enthusiasts. A pilot project route between Toronto and Algonquin Provincial Park began in 2010. Since then, Parkbus has become a project within Ontario not-for-profit organization Transportation Options, which works to provide sustainable tourism and transportation in the province of Ontario.

Parkbus operates one-day, overnight, guided overnight, and seasonal routes departing from Toronto,
 Vancouver,
 Montreal, Ottawa and Halifax.

Programs

TD Park Express

Since 2017, Parkbus operates seasonal free shuttles from Toronto to Rouge National Urban Park, from Edmonton to Elk Island National Park, and from Vancouver to Cypress Provincial Park.

NatureLink

Parkbus provides free transportation to natural parks for non-profits and other organizations that work with new immigrants and low income residents.

Ottawa - Gatineau Park Shuttle

In July 2019, Parkbus and the National Capital Commission announced a pilot bus service connecting downtown Ottawa and Gatineau Park in Quebec

References

2010 establishments in Canada
Transport companies of Canada